Horner Nunatak is a nunatak  east of Staack Nunatak, in eastern Palmer Land, Antarctica. It was mapped by the United States Geological Survey from surveys and U.S. Navy air photos, 1961–67, and was named by the Advisory Committee on Antarctic Names for Stanley Horner, a radioscience researcher at Byrd Station in summer 1962–63.

References

Nunataks of Palmer Land